Johad Ferretti (born 30 May 1994) is an Italian footballer who plays for Turris.

Club career

Genoa
Born in Marseille, France to Italian parents, Ferretti started his career at France, and then returned to his native country for Genoa C.F.C. He was a member of age-specific under-17 team in 2010–11 season, in National "Allievi" League. On 4 January 2012 Ferretti and Andrea Caracciolo were signed by Novara Calcio's youth system and first team on temporary deals respectively. Ferretti made his Campionato Nazionale Primavera debut in 2012–13 season for Genoa's youth team. He was booked in that match.

Milan
On 31 August 2012 he was signed by A.C. Milan, in a cashless swap with goalkeeper Antonio Donnarumma. Both players were valued for €1.8 million transfer fee. Ferretti spent a season with the youth team before he leaving Milan in temporary deals.

On 11 July 2013 he was signed by Benevento. In 2014, he was signed by SPAL. On 10 January 2015 he was signed by Matera.

AlbinoLeffe
On 11 January 2016 Ferretti was signed by AlbinoLeffe.

Cremonese
On 1 October 2016 Ferretti was signed by Cremonese.

Ternana
On 2 August 2017 Ferretti joined Ternana on a two-year contract.

Serie C
On 8 July 2018 Ferretti joined Teramo. On 31 January 2019 he joined Lucchese until the end of the 2018–19 season. For undisclosed reasons, he was not registered for Lucchese and on 26 February 2019 he signed with Gubbio instead.

After 1.5 years without a club, on 16 February 2021 he signed with Turris.

International career
Ferretti was a member of Italy national under-19 football team. He also played for the U19 team at 2013 Mediterranean Games. However the team de facto an under-20 team in June 2013, as born 1994 was eliminated from the final round of 2012–13 season and ineligible to 2013–14 edition.

References

External links
 
 

1994 births
Living people
Footballers from Marseille
Italian people of French descent
Italian footballers
Olympique de Marseille players
Genoa C.F.C. players
Novara F.C. players
A.C. Milan players
Benevento Calcio players
S.P.A.L. players
F.C. Matera players
Ternana Calcio players
S.S. Teramo Calcio players
S.S.D. Lucchese 1905 players
A.S. Gubbio 1910 players
Serie B players
Serie C players
Italy youth international footballers
Association football defenders
Competitors at the 2013 Mediterranean Games
Mediterranean Games competitors for Italy